Bowdoin Fjord is a fjord in northern Greenland. To the south the fjord opens into the Inglefield Gulf of the Baffin Bay.

This fjord was named by Robert Peary after his alma mater, Bowdoin College. It was the subject of paintings by Frank Wilbert Stokes at the end of the 19th century.

Geography
Bowdoin Fjord runs in a roughly north–south direction with its mouth west of Cape Milne and 15 km west of Cape Ackland, in the northern shore of the middle reaches of the Inglefield Gulf. Piulip Nunaa is the peninsula that separates this fjord from MacCormick Fjord to the west and northwest; Bowdoin Fjord forms its eastern coastline. To the east lies Prudhoe Land. There is an Inuit settlement on the western shore of the fjord roughly 3 km north of Cape Tyrconnel.

The Bowdoin Glacier discharges from the Greenland Ice Sheet at the head of the Bowdoin Fjord.

See also
List of fjords of Greenland

References

External links

Greenland Institute of Natural Resources - Grønlands Naturinstitut

Fjords of Greenland